Jonathan Suárez may refer to:

Jonathan Suárez (BMX rider), Venezuelan professional BMX cyclist
Jonathan Suárez (soccer), American soccer player